Sigbjørn Johnsen (born 1 October 1950) is a Norwegian politician for the Labour Party and was Norwegian Minister of Finance in the periods 1990–1996 and 2009–2013.

He is a former member of parliament and served as County Governor of Hedmark from 1997 to 2018. He was member of parliament for Hedmark between 1977 and 1997 and was the Minister of Finance from 1990 to 1996 during the Brundtland's Third Cabinet. He made a comeback in national politics when again he became Minister of Finance in 2009 Stoltenberg's Second Cabinet. After serving in the Stoltenberg's Second Cabinet, he resumed his duty as County Governor of Hedmark.

He was also the deputy chairman of the Workers' Youth League between 1975 and 1977.

References

1950 births
Living people
Members of the Storting
Ministers of Finance of Norway
Labour Party (Norway) politicians
County governors of Norway
20th-century Norwegian politicians